Czesław Olech (22 May 1931 – 1 July 2015) was a Polish mathematician. He was a representative of the Kraków school of mathematics, especially the differential equations school of Tadeusz Ważewski.

Education and career
In 1954 he completed his mathematical studies at the Jagiellonian University in Kraków, obtained his doctorate at the Institute of Mathematical Sciences in 1958, habilitation in 1962, the title of associate professor in 1966, and the title of professor in 1973.
1970–1986: director of The Institute of Mathematics, Polish Academy of Sciences.
1972–1991: director of Stefan Banach International Mathematical Center in Warsaw.
1979–1986: member of the Executive Committee, International Mathematical Union.
1982–1983: president of the Organizing Committee, International Congress of Mathematicians in Warsaw,
1987–1989: president of the Board of Mathematics, Polish Academy of Sciences.
1990–2002: president of the Scientific Council, Institute of Mathematics of the Polish Academy of Sciences.

Czeslaw Olech, often as a visiting professor, was invited by the world's leading mathematical centers in the United States, USSR (later Russia), Canada and many European countries. He cooperated with Solomon Lefschetz, Sergey Nikolsky, Philip Hartman and Roberto Conti, the most distinguished mathematicians involved in the theory of differential equations. Lefschetz highly valued Ważewski's school, and especially the retract method, which Olech applied by developing, among other things, control theory. He supervised nine doctoral dissertations, and reviewed a number of theses and dissertations.

Main fields of research interest
Contributions to ordinary differential equations:
various applications of Tadeusz Ważewski topological method in studying asymptotic behaviour of solutions;
exact estimates of exponential growth of solution of second-order linear differential equations with bounded coefficients;
theorems concerning global asymptotic stability of the autonomous system on the plane with stable Jacobian matrix at each point of the plane, results establishing relation between question of global asymptotic stability of an autonomous system and that of global one-to-oneness of a differentiable map;
contribution to the question whether unicity condition implies convergence of successive approximation to solutions of ordinary differential equations.
Contribution to optimal control theory:
establishing a most general version of the so-called bang-bang principle for linear control problem by detailed study of the integral of set valued map;
existence theorems for optimal control problem with unbounded controls and multidimensional cost functions;
existence of solution of differential inclusions with nonconvex right-hand side;
characterization of controllability of convex processes.

Recognition
Honorary doctorates:
Vilnius University 1989
Jagiellonian University in Kraków 2006
AGH University of Science and Technology in Kraków 2009.
Membership of:
PAN Polish Academy of Sciences (member of the Presidium),
PAU Polish Academy of Arts and Sciences
Pontifical Academy of Sciences
Russian Academy of Sciences
Polish Mathematical Society
European Mathematical Society
American Mathematical Society

Awards and honours:
State Prize of Poland 1st Class
The Commander's Cross of the Order of Polonia Restituta
Marin Drinov Golden Medal, Bulgarian Academy of Sciences
Bernard Bolzano Golden Medal, Czechoslovak Academy of Sciences
Stefan Banach Medal, Polish Academy of Sciences
Mikołaj Kopernik Medal, Polish Academy of Sciences

Publications

Notes and references

External links

1931 births
2015 deaths
Polish mathematicians
Members of the Polish Academy of Sciences
Members of the Polish Academy of Learning
Members of the Pontifical Academy of Sciences
Foreign Members of the USSR Academy of Sciences
Foreign Members of the Russian Academy of Sciences
Jagiellonian University alumni